The Iraqi Jewish Archive is a collection of 2,700 books and tens of thousands of historical documents from Iraq's Jewish community found by the United States Army in the basement of Saddam Hussein's intelligence headquarters during the US invasion of Iraq in 2003.

The collection includes a wide variety of books and rare documents, ranging from 500-year-old commentaries on the Talmud to personal letters sent during the 1950s. These materials were abandoned during Operation Ezra and Nehemiah, when almost all Iraqi Jews made aliyah to Israel on the condition (imposed by the Iraqi government) that they leave their property behind. The Intelligence Agency of the Iraqi regime subsequently gathered these books and documents from synagogues and Jewish community institutions, eventually storing them in the basement where they would be found by the US Army.

The archive has been in temporary US custody since 2003, and is scheduled to be transferred permanently to Iraq. This plan is controversial: some Middle-East scholars and Jewish organizations have opined that because the materials were abandoned under duress, and because almost no Jews live in Iraq today, the archive should instead be housed in Israel or the United States.

Discovery and preservation

The archive was found by the United States Army in 2003 in a flooded basement. It was rescued due to a book freezing process on special trucks. With the consent of the provisional Iraqi government, the archive was transferred to the National Archives of the United States in Washington, DC. At a cost of $3 million, the archive was digitized and is fully available online.
The documents are written in Hebrew, Arabic, Judeo-Arabic, and English. Certain irreparably damaged kosher scrolls (such as Torah scrolls and scrolls containing the Book of Esther) were ritually buried in accordance with Jewish law.

Debate over return to Iraq

The US National Archives' custody of the Iraqi Jewish Archive is temporary, and the United States is contractually obligated to return the collection to Iraq. This has engendered some opposition on the grounds that the collection rightfully belongs to Iraqi Jews, almost none of whom currently reside in Iraq. Harold Rhode, a Middle East specialist formerly at the Pentagon who was present when the collection was found, has suggested that it should be placed permanently in Israel.

In February 2014 the United States Senate unanimously passed a resolution calling on President Barack Obama to reopen new negotiations over the agreement on the archive return to Iraq. In May of the same year, the governments of the United States and Iraq had reached an agreement that most of the items of the archive would remain in the United States until September 2018. In September 2017, the State Department said it would not seek to further extend the agreement, but in July 2018 reversed course and announced that it would work with the Iraqi government to delay the return of the archive.

References

External links
 Moshe M. Shabat, Importance of the Iraqi Jewish Archive collection. Article and Catalog which holds information, that does not appear in the IJA website, about dozens of items from the IJA archive with clear community affiliation, which clearly shows that the State of Iraq stole these items from their owners.
Iraqi Jewish Archive at the National Archives and Records Administration website
Press release of the American National Archives on Exhibit Opening
iraqijewisharchives.org a website dedicated to the struggle not to return the Archive back to the Iraqi government 
Experts at odds on archive's legal standing Point of No Return website
Deal struck on Iraqi-Jewish archive Point of No Return website
 Edward Rothstein, The Remnants of a Culture’s Heart and Soul: Iraqi Jewish Documents at the National Archives, The New York Times, November 10, 2013.
 Itamar Tzur, 'Jewish documents should be given to Israel, not Iraq', Israel National News, September 18, 2017.

Jewish Iraqi history
State archives
Iraq–United States relations
Art and cultural repatriation
2003 in Judaism
Jewish archives